La Jornada is a statue by Reynaldo "Sonny" Rivera and Betty Sabo which depicts Juan de Oñate leading an expedition of Spanish settlers.

History
The statue was commissioned in the late 1990s, and installed on the grounds of the Albuquerque Museum in Albuquerque, New Mexico in 2004. It was removed by the city in June 2020, following an attempt by protesters to topple it as part of the George Floyd protests which led to one protester being shot by a counter-protester.

Native activists have long opposed monuments to conquistadors, and Oñate is specifically controversial due to having ordered the murder and mutilation of hundreds of people during the Acoma Massacre of 1599.

See also

 Equestrian statue of Juan de Oñate – Another statue of Oñate in New Mexico which was removed following protests
 List of monuments and memorials removed during the George Floyd protests

References

Buildings and structures in Albuquerque, New Mexico
Monuments and memorials in New Mexico
Monuments and memorials removed during the George Floyd protests
Outdoor sculptures in New Mexico
Sculptures of men in the United States
Statues in the United States
Statues removed in 2020